Tierra de Nadie (English: No man's land) is the fifth studio album by the Spanish heavy metal band Barón Rojo. It was released in 1987.

Track listing

References

1987 albums
Barón Rojo albums
Spanish-language albums